The Huacaybamba Province is one of eleven provinces of the Huánuco Region in Peru. The capital of this province is the city of Huacaybamba.

Boundaries
North: Marañón Province
East: Leoncio Prado Province
South: Huamalíes Province
West: Ancash Region

Geography 
Other mountains are listed below:

Political division
The province is divided into four districts, which are:

 Canchabamba
 Cochabamba
 Huacaybamba
 Pinra

Ethnic groups 
The people in the province are mainly indigenous citizens of Quechua descent. Quechua is the language which the majority of the population (78.86%) learnt to speak in childhood, 20.45% of the residents started speaking using the Spanish language (2007 Peru Census).

See also
 Kinwaqucha
 Mamaqucha

Sources 

Provinces of the Huánuco Region